Devati Karma (born 1 July 1962) is an Indian politician from Chhattisgarh and a two term Member of the Chhattisgarh Legislative Assembly. Devati Karma represents the Dantewara Assembly constituency.

Positions held

References

Living people
20th-century Indian politicians
Indian National Congress politicians from Chhattisgarh
People from Dantewada district
1962 births
Chhattisgarh MLAs 2018–2023